Israel David Fishman (February 21, 1938 – June 14, 2006) was the founder of the Task Force on Gay Liberation.

Early life
Israel David Fishman was born on February 21, 1938, in Westerly, Rhode Island, the son of Minnie C. and Benjamin Fishman. They were Orthodox Jews. His father was an ordained rabbi, although he never practiced as clergyman.

In September 1946, at 8 years old, Fishman entered Yeshiva Torah Vodaath in Williamsburg, New York. At 15 years old he was hospitalized and treated with electric shock therapy.

Personal life and career

Between 1956 and 1965 Fishman worked as office assistant. In 1958, he enrolled in the City College of New York, first as an evening student, and then enrolling full-time. He graduated with a B.A. degree, magna cum laude and Phi Beta Kappa, in Philosophy in 1965. In May 1966, he received an M.L.S. from Columbia University's School of Library Science.

Fishman was the Head of Technical Services at the Jewish Theological Seminary library, and then Acquisitions Librarian at Richmond College. In 1970 Fishman became the Circulation Librarian at Upsala College in East Orange, New Jersey, and was also Assistant Professor. In early 1973, he was denied tenure and in January 1974 he left the college.

In 1970, Fishman attended the American Library Association meeting in Detroit and conceived the idea of a gay liberation group within the library profession. He was the founder of Task Force on Gay Liberation (TFGL), a section of the Social Responsibilities Round Table. He was succeeded in leadership of the Task Force on Gay Liberation by Barbara Gittings. Fishman was featured in the documentary Trembling Before God, and wrote chapters for the anthologies, Daring to Find Our Names and Liberating Minds.

Fishman moved to Los Angeles, California for work and study at the Gay Community Services Center. In 1973 he returned to New York to study Swedish massage and was licensed in 1974. The same year, Fishman met his partner, Carl Navarro at the West Side Discussion Group, a regular gathering of gay men. Fishman opened a mail order vitamin store, organized tours through Hasidic Brooklyn, and was active in the Park Slope Food Cooperative.

In 1989 he was photographed by Robert Giard for his series Particular Voices.

He died on June 14, 2006.

References

1938 births
2006 deaths
American librarians
American gay men
LGBT people from Rhode Island
American LGBT rights activists
20th-century American LGBT people